"Rockin' in the Free World" is a song by Canadian-American singer, musician and songwriter Neil Young, released on Young's seventeenth studio album Freedom (1989). Two versions of the song bookend the album, similarly to "Hey Hey, My My (Into the Black)" from Young's Rust Never Sleeps album, one of which is performed with a predominantly acoustic arrangement, and the other predominantly electric. Rolling Stone magazine ranked "Rockin' In the Free World" number 214 on its "500 Greatest Songs of All Time"

Context 
Young wrote the song while on tour with his band The Restless in February 1989. He learned that a planned concert tour to the Soviet Union was not going to happen and his guitarist Frank "Poncho" Sampedro said "we'll have to keep on rockin' in the free world". The phrase struck Young, who thought it could be the hook in a song about "stuff going on with the Ayatollah and all this turmoil in the world.”  He had the lyrics the next day.

The lyrics criticize the George H. W. Bush administration, then in its first month, quoting Bush's famous "thousand points of light" remark from his 1989 inaugural address and his 1988 presidential campaign promise for America to become a "kinder, gentler nation". The song also refers to Ayatollah Khomeini's proclamation that the United States was the "Great Satan" and Jesse Jackson's 1988 campaign slogan, "Keep hope alive".  The song was first performed live on February 21, 1989, in Seattle with The Restless, without the band having rehearsed it.

The song is included on Young's Greatest Hits (2004) release.  It reached No. 2 on the Billboard's Mainstream Rock Tracks chart.

Charts

Cover versions
"Rockin' in the Free World" has been recorded by numerous other artists. A version by The Alarm appears on their album Raw (1991). Pearl Jam, joined by Neil Young, performed the song at the 1993 MTV Video Music Awards and has frequently performed it live in concert. It was also done by Swiss hard rock band Krokus on their 2017 covers collection Big Rocks. Roots rock duo Larkin Poe released a cover on their 2020 album Kindred Spirits. American nu metal band Soil released a cover in 2022.

Use of the song in US politics
Since its release the song has been used a number of times at different US political events.

In 2015 and 2016, the song was played during Donald Trump's grand entry preceding his formal announcement that he would run as a Republican candidate for the 2016 presidency. Young, a longtime supporter of Bernie Sanders, said that Trump's use of "Rockin' in the Free World" was not authorized. The contention, later determined to be a licensing issue, was resolved, and Trump's campaign used the song. Young explained to Rolling Stone that he had no issue with the campaign using the song.

Bernie Sanders also used the song at rallies for his 2016 presidential campaign.

In 2020, Trump again used the song at a pre-Fourth of July speech at Mount Rushmore on July 3, along with two other Young songs ("Like a Hurricane" and "Cowgirl in the Sand"). A tweet from Young from the official Neil Young Archives Twitter account responded to the usage of "Rockin' in the Free World” by retweeting a tweet from Rapid City Journal reporter Morgan Matzen that contained a video with the song playing at the Trump event with Young adding "This is NOT ok with me…". A minute later Young retweeted a second Matzen tweet, this time one showing a video of Young's song "Like a Hurricane" playing before the President took the stage, with Young adding "I stand in solidarity with the Lakota Sioux & this is NOT ok with me." On August 4, 2020, Young filed a lawsuit in the Southern District of New York against the Trump campaign for copyright infringement for its use of "Rockin' in the Free World" and "Devil's Sidewalk" after both songs had been removed from ASCAP's political license. On December 7, 2020, Young voluntarily dismissed the case.

References 

Protest songs
Songs about freedom
Songs about the United States
Neil Young songs
Songs written by Neil Young
Canadian hard rock songs
Canadian folk rock songs
Country rock songs
Music videos directed by Julien Temple
Reprise Records singles
Cultural depictions of George H. W. Bush
Song recordings produced by Neil Young
Song recordings produced by Niko Bolas
1989 songs
1989 singles
Anti-Americanism